The James and Sophia Clemens Farmstead is a historic farm in far western Darke County, Ohio, United States.

Natives of Rockingham County, Virginia, James and Sophia Clemens settled in Darke County in 1818 and soon became prosperous farmers.  Their success led many other former slaves to migrate to the vicinity, and a community known as "Longtown" (alternately "Tampico") gradually grew up in the vicinity of the Clemens farm.  As the years passed, the community became a center for the Underground Railroad, complete with a Quaker school known as the Union Literary Institute; among the movement's leaders in the community were the Clemens family.

The Clemens house itself was erected circa 1850 on land that its residents purchased in 1822.  A two-story brick I-house, it rests on a limestone foundation and is covered with a tin roof.  Although the house today sits without human inhabitants, a movement to restore the house and designate the Longtown vicinity a state historic landmark began in the mid-2000s.  The Clemens house itself has been designated a historic site, having been listed on the National Register of Historic Places in 2001, along with the other building on the property.  It qualified for the Register both because of its place in local history and because of its association with James Clemens, who was seen as a significant individual in the history of Darke County.

See also
List of Underground Railroad sites

References

Houses completed in 1850
Houses in Darke County, Ohio
Farms on the National Register of Historic Places in Ohio
Houses on the National Register of Historic Places in Ohio
Houses on the Underground Railroad
National Register of Historic Places in Darke County, Ohio